SaxaVord Spaceport, previously known as Shetland Space Centre, is a planned spaceport to be located on the Lamba Ness peninsula on Unst, the most northerly of the Shetland Islands. The proposed site is near the RAF Saxa Vord radar station and the settlement of Skaw, adjacent to the Saxa Vord distillery.

History
Lockheed Martin's UK Pathfinder satellite launch system may launch from this spaceport. The proposed launch vehicle under this programme is the RS1 from ABL Space Systems, a US-based company developing 27 m tall rockets capable of carrying payloads up to 1000 kg into a Sun-synchronous orbit. The UK Pathfinder Launch programme is supported by £23.5 million of UK Space Agency grants.

The launch site would also be used by HyImpulse Technologies, a German rocket maker aiming for engine and suborbital testing by the end of 2021, with orbital launches by 2023.

In October 2021, Skyrora signed a multi-launch deal over the next decade for this site, hoping to start sending satellites into orbit within 2022.

Plans for the spaceport were submitted to Shetland Islands Council by Farningham Planning in January 2021 to enable up to 30 launches per year. The proposal is for three rocket launch pads on Lamba Ness peninsula with additional infrastructure such as a satellite tracking facility, rocket hangars and integration facilities. The plans also document proposals for a Range Control Centre at the former RAF Saxa Vord complex, fuel storage facilities at Ordale Airport at Baltasound, and improvements to the launch site's approach roads.

On 29 March 2021, Historic Environment Scotland (HES), a statutory body, refused consent for the development on the grounds it would destroy a scheduled monument of national significance. The refusal of consent carries significant legal weight, as it is a criminal offence to carry out works to a scheduled monument without such authorisation. Due to the almost one-to-one overlap of the monument location with the proposed spaceport, this refusal has led to concerns being voiced about the viability of the Shetland spaceport project. On 20 January 2022, Historic Environment Scotland withdrew its objection, stating "We recognise the benefits that this development will bring to the community in Unst".

In January 2023, Rocket Factory Augsburg signed a multi-year launch agreement which would give the company exclusive access to the northernmost launch pad of the spaceport, Launch Pad Fredo, with testing of the RFA One core stage beginning in mid-2023 and a first launch scheduled in late 2023.

See also 

 Sutherland spaceport
 Space industry of Scotland

References

External links 
 

Shetland
Unst
Spaceports in Europe
Space programme of the United Kingdom